Spyce Kitchen or just Spyce was a robotic-powered restaurant which prepares food in "three minutes or less".

History
MIT mechanical engineering graduates Michael Farid, Brady Knight, Luke Schlueter and Kale Rogers developed the kitchen using seven autonomous work stations to prepare bowl-based meals using healthy ingredients such as kale, beans and grains. The four graduates wanted to make healthy meals more affordable, so they built the robotic technology and initially served the food to students at an MIT dining hall. The group received the $10,000 “Eat It” Lemelson-MIT undergraduate prize in 2016 as one of America's top two collegiate inventors in food technology.

The four then teamed up with chef Daniel Boulud to create the new menu for their restaurant. Prices start at $7.50 for an entire meal in a bowl at their first real branch, which opened on May 3, 2018, in Boston, Massachusetts. Referred to as the "Spyce Boys", the four founders were inspired by their experiences as hungry student athletes on tight budgets. Spyce Kitchen automated cooking units also clean up after cooking and dirtying the cooking apparatus.

Funding 
Spyce raised $21 million in series A funding in September 2018, led by venture capital firms Maveron, Collaborative Fund, and Khosla Ventures.

Acquisition by Sweetgreen
In 2021, the company was acquired by Sweetgreen, a chain of salad restaurants.

Restaurants 
Spyce operated and then shuttered  two restaurants in the Greater Boston Area. Their first restaurant was located at 241 Washington St, MA in downtown Boston. Their second restaurant, which opened in February 2021, was located at 1 Brattle Sq, MA, at Harvard Square.

Closure 
Both Spyce restaurants would be closed following the Sweetgreen acquisition. The downtown Boston location would be closed October 22, 2021 "to focus on developing technology for Sweetgreen restaurants." The Harvard Square location would be closed February 18, 2022 for similar reasons.

References

External links
 

Robotics
Robotic restaurants